As You Like It is a 1936 British romantic comedy film directed by Paul Czinner and starring Laurence Olivier as Orlando and Elisabeth Bergner as Rosalind. It is based on William Shakespeare's play of the same name. It was Olivier's first performance of Shakespeare on screen.

It was the final film of stage actors Leon Quartermaine and Henry Ainley, and featured an early screen role for Ainley's son Richard as Sylvius, as well as for John Laurie, who played Orlando's brother Oliver. (Laurie would go on to co-star with Olivier in the three Shakespearean films that Olivier directed.)

Bergner had previously played the role of Rosalind in her native Germany and her German accent is apparent in most of her scenes.

Synopsis
Duke Frederick (Felix Aylmer) has usurped and deposed his older brother, Duke Senior (Henry Ainley). Frederick allows the exiled Duke's daughter, Rosalind (Elisabeth Bergner), however, to stay, as she is the closest friend of his daughter, Celia (Sophie Stewart). Orlando (Laurence Olivier), who has been forced to flee his home due to the oppression from his brother, Oliver (John Laurie), comes to the Frederick's Duchy, and enters a wrestling tournament. On leaving the Duchy, Orlando encounters Rosalind, and it is love at first sight. Frederick then becomes angry, and banishes Rosalind. Celia decides to accompany her, along with a jester, Touchstone (Mackenzie Ward).

Rosalind and Celia disguise themselves as "Ganymede", a boy, and "Aliena", respectively, and venture into the Forest of Arden, where they eventually encounter the exiled Duke. Orlando, deeply in love, posts love poems on the trees in praise of Rosalind. Orlando comes across Ganymede, who tells him he can teach Orlando how to cure love by pretending to be Rosalind. At the same time, Phoebe (Joan White), a shepherdess, falls in love with Ganymede, though he (she) continually rejects her. Sylvius (Richard Ainley), a shepherd, is in love with Phoebe, which complicates the matter. Meanwhile, Touchstone attempts to marry the simple farmgirl, Audrey (Dorice Fordred), before he can be stopped by Jaques (Leon Quartermaine), a Lord who lives with the exiled Duke.

Orlando rescues Oliver from a lioness in the forest, causing Oliver to repent and re-embrace his brother. Ganymede, Orlando, Phoebe, and Silvius are brought together to sort out who marries whom. Ganymede proposes that Orlando promise to marry Rosalind, and Phoebe promise to marry Silvius if she cannot marry Ganymede. The next day, Rosalind reveals herself. Orlando and Rosalind, Oliver and Celia, Silvius and Phoebe, and Touchstone and Audrey are all then married, and they learn that Frederick has also repented and decided to reinstate his brother as the Duke.

Cast

Production
The 1936 adaptation was directed in London by Paul Czinner, an Austrian Jew who fled his home country to avoid political persecution. The film stars his wife, Elizabeth Bergner, also an Austrian Jewish refugee. To the persecuted, the escape to the Forest of Arden does not simply represent, as Celia sees it, a place to spend time and relax so much as an escape to freedom. This view is reflected in the film created by refugees, and speaks to other refugees and exiles.

Music
The film is notable for being scored by William Walton, who was to become Olivier's longtime musical collaborator, scoring his films of Henry V, Hamlet and Richard III, and defending his score for the film Battle of Britain against its replacement by Ron Goodwin's.

Reception
Writing for The Spectator in 1936, Graham Greene gave the film a mixed review. When considering the film as a work of Shakespeare, Greene noted that the film maintained a relatively high level of faithfulness to the original play despite the British Board of Film Censors' disapprobation of anything remotely approaching immodesty. Greene praised the acting of Bergner and Olivier, although he expressed dissatisfaction with that of Ainley and Quartermaine. When considering the film as a cinematic experience, Greene found it to be "less satisfactory". Criticizing Czinner for treating the medium as little more than a larger stage with "far too many dull middle-length shots from a fixed camera", Greene suggested that the presentation of the story was disappointing.

Notes and references

External links

1936 films
1936 romantic comedy films
British romantic comedy films
British black-and-white films
20th Century Fox films
Films directed by Paul Czinner
Films based on As You Like It
Films scored by William Walton
Films produced by Joseph M. Schenck
British films based on plays
Films shot at Station Road Studios, Elstree
Films shot at British International Pictures Studios
1930s British films